Luca Lazar or Luka Lasareishvili is a Georgian artist. He was born on 14 November 1957 in Tbilisi, Georgia (former Soviet Union). He studied at the Tbilisi State Art Academy from 1976 to 1982 from which he graduated with a Masters of Fine Arts degree. Since 1982 he has been working as an independent, professional artist and participated in numerous solo- and group exhibitions in galleries and museums. He has worked in a variety of media: painting, installations, object and video art. From 1985 until 1988 Lazar lived and worked in Moscow, Russia. He then moved on to Paris, France. The following year, 1989, Lazar spent in Kassel, Germany as an artist-in-residence with the Museum Fridericianum. From 1990 until 2003 Lazar lived and worked in Cologne, Germany. During his time in Germany, sweeping changes were taking place in his native region that led to the collapse of the Soviet Union, the declaration of independence of Georgia and was followed by armed conflicts and civil war in his country of origin. As Lazar was unable to return, he stayed on in Germany, where he eventually received citizenship. From 1997 until 2005 he held a position as lecturer at the European Academy of Fine Arts in Trier, Germany. In 2003 Lazar relocated to New York City, United States, where he has continued his artistic career.

By the late 1990s Lazar started to concentrate mainly on geometrical art, which was followed by minimal abstract explorations, resulting in a series titled "The White Curtain" and a series titled "One-liners". From this point onward Lazar started to develop his own signature style, based on minimal abstract art, geometric art, optical art and containing important undertones of expressionist art, which resulted in works that are unlike any existing art direction or style. These works provide a sensation of continuous flowing movement in space, hence their title "Moving Stills"

The underlying principle of the works of "Moving Stills" has been described as:

“controlled energy, raw powers created through and at the same time restricted by spatial structures and the arrangement of interlocking lines. Using a reduced vocabulary of minimalist forms, the untitled individual works in this series provide the suggestion of energetic movement within a motionless, frozen setting. The works are not informed by any kind of anticipation of what the viewer may or may not see in them, but rather are to be understood by making the actual attempt of leaving the ways of perception behind that we are so accustomed to, in order to be “felt” quite intuitively in an act of self-communication.” (source Marcel Krenz, art critic, in Catalogue “Luca Lazar: Moving Stills” Gallery Schüppenhauer Köln)

Select Exhibitions

2012
“Georgian artists of the 80s and 90s”, The National Museum, Tbilisi, Georgia

2011
“Festinova” – Art festival, Georgian Art Centre “Garikula”, Georgia"Georgian Artists working in Europe", as part of European days events –Tbilisi, Georgia

2010
“ART MOSCOW”- Moscow “COINCIDENCE” - Spektre Gallery, Brooklyn, NY (USA)

2009
“Born in Georgia”, Cobra Museum of Modern Art, Amstelveen, NL, (K)“L’Art Contemporian De Georgie” Chateau de Saint-Auvent, (France)‘’ Tbilissi Underground’ 09’’     (France)

2008
‘’Paris Montparnasse Tbilissi’’ Le Musse du Montparnsse, Paris, (France) (K)

2007
55 Mercer Gallery – ‘’Moving Stills’’ New York, NY (USA)

2006
A Space Gallery - presents ‘’Intrinsic Form’’ Brooklyn, NY (USA)

2005/2006
“Moving Stills”, Gallery Schüppenhauer, Cologne (Germany)

2005
Grant Gallery ‘’Mysticism in Art’’ New York, NY, (USA)

2004
“Art from Perestroika till today”, State Art Museum, Tbilisi (Georgia) –(k)“Invitation to a Beheading”, Gallery Schüppenhauer, Cologne (Germany)

2003
"Statements Basel-Köln”, Gallery Kämpf, Basel (Switzerland) and Gallery Schüppenhauer, Cologne (Germany)

2002
“ART Frankfurt” (Germany)

2001
"One-liners", Gallery Jule Kewenig Frechen-Bachem (Germany)

2000
"The White Curtain", Gallery Schüppenhauer, Cologne (Germany)

1999
"Fazit" - Moving Images, Neon-installation, Gallery Schüppenhauer, Cologne (Germany)

1998
"Transformation" Installation - UNESCO, Paris (France)-(k) "The Bridging" Installation art in public space, Cologne (Germany)"Opposite of Eden" Installation, Art House Kaufbeuren (Germany)-(k)"Dialogue" Museum for Regional History and Art, Buxtehude (Germany)-(k)

1997
"The Conscience" - "STADT(t)ART" Installation Art countrywide cooperation project, Hürth (Germany) -(k) "M.E.S.S.A.G.E." Positions of current art –Video-installation Gallery Schüppenhauer, Cologne (Germany)-(k)

1996
"Dialogue" Leopold Hoisch Museum, Düren (Germany)-(k)
 
1995
Art Cologne 4, Josef-Haubrich-Art-Hall, Cologne (Germany)-(k)Ursula-Blickle-Art-Prize for "Installation", 1st prize, with special foreword and recognition in catalogue by Ilya Kabakov, Ursula-Blickle-Foundation, Kraichtal (Germany) -(k)

1994
"Last Supper" - Gallery Jule Kewenig, Frechen-Bachem (Germany)              (In the Showroom of Gallery Johnen& Schöttle, Cologne) –(k)

1993
"Crusades III" - Installation, Cologne (Germany) (in cooperation with Gallery Friedrich, Cologne)

1992
"The Cradle of Humanity", Frankfurt am Main  (Germany)
(In cooperation with Price Waterhouse Corporate Finance and the Worldwide Life Foundation)-(k)

1991 
Two Georgian Painters – Museum St. Wendel (Germany)-(k)

1990
"Georgia on my Mind" - Four Painters from Tbilisi, Dumont Art Hall, Cologne (Germany)-(k)Paintings from Georgia, Mona-Bismarck-Foundation, Paris (France)-(k)International Exhibition in the House of Arts, Cagnes (France): 2nd prize by Art critics jury-(c)Two Georgian Painters – Arts Hall Kiel (Germany)

1989
Soviet Contemporary Art, Hôtel de Ville, Strasbourg (France) (with Ilya Kabakov)-(c)Exhibition on new Soviet Painting, Warschau (Poland)-(c)"Perestroika Man" - Three Georgian Painters, Soviet Art House, Moscow (Russia)-(c)"Georgia on my Mind" - Four Painters from Tbilisi, Museum Fridericianum, Kassel (Germany) –(c)

1988
"Glasnost" - the new freedom of Russian painters, Art Hall Emden (Germany)-New Art from the USSR and Bulgaria, Dallas (USA)

1987
"Generation-80", House of Arts Tbilisi (Georgia)Exhibition Georgian Abstract Art, Exhibition Hall "Ermitage", Moscow (Russia)First Group Exhibition of abstract art by Georgian artists, State Paintings Gallery, Tbilisi (Georgia)"Interart-87", International Art Market/Bourse of Socialist countries, Warschau (Poland)

since 1982
Participation in several exhibition throughout the Soviet Union

Select weblinks

http://www.lucalazar.com/home.html
official website of artist Luca Lazar (Luka Lasareishvili)

http://momaps1.org/studio-visit/artist/luca-lazar

http://www.art.gov.ge/artists.php?lang=En&artist=374

http://www.artslant.com/global/artists/show/56523-luka-lasareishvili

http://kaukasus.blogspot.com/2012/09/georgian-artists-of-80s-and-90s-in.html

https://web.archive.org/web/20120219094633/http://www.karinthomas.eu/bibliografie.php?DOC_INST=6

https://www.youtube.com/watch?v=CU_LT_h-KNw

https://web.archive.org/web/20140425003522/http://www.propagandaweb.ge/artist.php?id=21

https://web.archive.org/web/20160225102519/https://archive.today/20140329225105/http://www.travelwithjan.com/gallery2/main.php/gallery/2012georgiatbilisi/museum/IMG_0027.JPG.html

http://www.artfacts.net/en/artist/luka-lasareishvili-132411/profile.html

http://www.worldcat.org/title/georgia-on-my-mind-vier-maler-aus-tbilissi-tiflis-alexander-bandzeladze-gia-edzgveradze-luka-lasareishvili-iliko-zautashvili/oclc/027240405

https://books.google.com/books/about/Georgia_on_my_mind_Alexander_Bandzeladze.html?id=2zk0twAACAAJ

http://www.worldcat.org/title/ursula-blickle-kunstpreis-95-installation-0411-031295/oclc/57455251&referer=brief_results

https://www.artist-info.com/users/artsitpublicpag http://www.smartsgallery.com/artists/lucalazar/ewithoutportfoilo/107007

https://www.amazon.de/s-s-Positionen-aktueller-Kunst-Lasareishvili/dp/3926226404

http://www.ncca.ru/mediaitem?filial=2&itemid=3360&listpage=2

http://www.ncca.ru/mediaitem?filial=2&itemid=3359&listpage=11

https://archive.today/20140329225123/http://www.cobra-museum.nl/en/archive.html

http://netherlands.mfa.gov.ge/files/netherlands/A5_1.pdf

http://www.8weekly.nl/artikel/7059/diverse-kunstenaars-born-in-georgia-hedendaagse-kunst-uit-georgie-haaienkaken-en-leren-jurken.html

http://www.amstelveenweb.com/nieuws-Born-in-Georgia-in-het-Cobra-Museum&newsid=87402576

https://books.google.com/books/about/Georgia_on_my_mind_Alexander_Bandzeladze.html?id=2zk0twAACAAJ

http://www.leo-bw.de/web/guest/detail/-/Detail/details/DOKUMENT/wlbblb_labi/911426/Installation++Ursula-Blickle-Preis+'95+%3B+411-31295+%3B+%5BLuka+Lasareishvili+Stephen+Prina+Wolfgang+Stiller%5D+-+Ursula-Blickle-Stiftung;jsessionid=4D6A4D5B0C5F6BAD2EE0FDB2343CA671

http://www.ncca.ru/mediaitem?filial=2&itemid=3360

http://georgianartistsarchidrome.blogspot.com/

https://archive.today/20140329225036/http://www.artfacts.net/en/artist/luka-lasareishvili-132411/profile.html

https://archive.today/20140329225105/http://www.travelwithjan.com/gallery2/main.php/gallery/2012georgiatbilisi/museum/IMG_0027.JPG.html

Artists from Georgia (country)
Russian artists
1957 births
Living people
Tbilisi State Academy of Arts alumni